Sidney James Webb, 1st Baron Passfield,  (13 July 1859 – 13 October 1947) was a British socialist, economist and reformer, who co-founded the London School of Economics. He was an early member of the Fabian Society in 1884, joining, like George Bernard Shaw, three months after its inception. Along with his wife Beatrice Webb and with Annie Besant, Graham Wallas, Edward R. Pease, Hubert Bland and Sydney Olivier, Shaw and Webb turned the Fabian Society into the pre-eminent politico-intellectual society in Edwardian England. He wrote the original, pro-nationalisation Clause IV for the British Labour Party.

Background and education
Webb was born in London to a professional family. He studied law at the Birkbeck Literary and Scientific Institution for a degree of the University of London in his spare time, while holding an office job. He also studied at King's College London, before being called to the Bar in 1885.

Professional life
In 1895, Webb helped to found the London School of Economics with a bequest left to the Fabian Society. He was appointed its Professor of Public Administration in 1912 and held the post for 15 years. In 1892, he married Beatrice Potter, who shared his interests and beliefs. The money she contributed to the marriage enabled him to give up his clerical job and concentrate on his other activities. Sidney and Beatrice Webb founded the New Statesman magazine in 1913.

Political career

Webb and Potter were members of the Labour Party and took an active role in politics. Sidney became Member of Parliament for Seaham at the 1922 general election. The couple's influence can be seen in their hosting of the Coefficients, a dining club that drew in some leading statesmen and thinkers of the day. In 1929, he was created Baron Passfield of Passfield Corner in the County of Southampton. He served as Secretary of State for the Colonies and as Secretary of State for Dominion Affairs in Ramsay MacDonald's second Labour Government in 1929. 

As Colonial Secretary he issued the Passfield White Paper that revised the government policy on Palestine, previously set by the Churchill White Paper of 1922. In 1930, failing health caused him to step down as Dominions Secretary, but he stayed on as Colonial Secretary until the fall of the Labour government in August 1931.

The Webbs ignored mounting evidence of atrocities being committed by Joseph Stalin and remained supporters of the Soviet Union until their deaths. Having reached their seventies and early eighties, their books, Soviet Communism: A New Civilisation? (1935) and The Truth About Soviet Russia (1942), still gave a positive assessment of Stalin's regime. The Trotskyist historian Al Richardson later dubbed Soviet Communism: A New Civilization? "pure Soviet propaganda at its most mendacious".

Writings
Webb co-authored with his wife The History of Trade Unionism (1894). For the Fabian Society he wrote on poverty in London, the eight-hour day, land nationalisation, the nature of socialism, education, eugenics, and reform of the House of Lords. He also drafted Clause IV, which committed the Labour Party to public ownership of industry.

References in literature

In H. G. Wells' The New Machiavelli (1911), the Webbs, as "the Baileys", are mercilessly lampooned as short-sighted, bourgeois manipulators. The Fabian Society, of which Wells was briefly a member (1903–1908), fares no better in his estimation.

Beatrice Webb in her diary records that they "read the caricatures of ourselves... with much interest and amusement. The portraits are very clever in a malicious way." She reviews the book and Wells's character, summarising: "As an attempt at representing a political philosophy the book utterly fails..."

Personal life

When his wife, Beatrice, died in 1943, the casket of her ashes was buried in the garden of their house in Passfield Corner, as were those of Lord Passfield in 1947.

Shortly afterwards, George Bernard Shaw launched a petition to have both reburied in Westminster Abbey, which was eventually granted – the Webbs' ashes are interred in the nave, close to those of Clement Attlee and Ernest Bevin.

The Passfields were also friends of philosopher Bertrand Russell.

In 2006, the London School of Economics, alongside the Housing Association, renamed its Great Dover Street student residence Sidney Webb House in his honour.

Archives
Sidney Webb's papers form part of the Passfield archive at the London School of Economics. Posts about Sidney Webb regularly appear in the LSE Archives blog.

Bibliography

Notes

Further reading
Bevir, Mark. "Sidney Webb: Utilitarianism, positivism, and social democracy." Journal of Modern History 74.2 (2002): 217–252 online
Cole, Margaret, et al. The Webbs and their work (1949)
Davanzati, Guglielmo Forges, and Andrea Pacella. "Sidney and Beatrice Webb: Towards an Ethical Foundation of the Operation of the Labour Market." History of Economic Ideas (2004): 25–49
Farnham, David. “Beatrice and Sidney Webb and the Intellectual Origins of British Industrial Relations.” Employee Relations (2008). 30: 534–552
Harrison, Royden. The Life and Times of Sydney and Beatrice Webb, 1858-1905 (2001)
Kaufman, Bruce E. "Sidney and Beatrice Webb's Institutional Theory of Labor Markets and Wage Determination." Industrial Relations: A Journal of Economy and Society 52.3 (2013): 765–791. online
MacKenzie, Norman Ian, and Jeanne MacKenzie. The First Fabians (Quartet Books, 1979)
Radice, Lisanne. Beatrice and Sidney Webb: Fabian Socialists (Springer, 1984)
Stigler, George. “Bernard Shaw, Sidney Webb, and the Theory of Fabian Socialism,” Proceedings of the American Philosophical Society (1959) 103#3: 469–475

Primary sources
Mackenzie, Norman, ed. The Letters of Sidney and Beatrice Webb (3 volumes. Cambridge University Press, 1978, pp. xvii, 453; xi, 405; ix, 482) 
Volume 1. Apprenticeships 1873–1892 (1978)
Volume 2. Partnership 1892–1912 (1978)
Volume 3. Pilgrimage, 1912–1947 (1978)

External links

Critique of Webb by Leon Trotsky in The Revolution Betrayed
The Webb Bibliography
The Webb Diaries available in full from LSE

1859 births
1947 deaths
Academics of the London School of Economics
Alumni of Birkbeck, University of London
Alumni of King's College London
Passfield
British reformers
Passfield
Chairs of the Labour Party (UK)
British cooperative organizers
English socialists
Labor historians
Labour Party (UK) hereditary peers
Labour Party (UK) MPs for English constituencies
Members of London County Council
Members of the Fabian Society
Members of the Order of Merit
Members of the Privy Council of the United Kingdom
Potter family
Progressive Party (London) politicians
Secretaries of State for the Colonies
Socialist economists
UK MPs 1922–1923
UK MPs 1923–1924
UK MPs 1924–1929
UK MPs who were granted peerages
Writers about the Soviet Union
Writers from London
British Secretaries of State for Dominion Affairs
Presidents of the Board of Trade
People from Liphook
Barons created by George V